West of Nevada is a 1936 American Western film directed by Robert F. Hill and starring Rex Bell, Joan Barclay and Al St. John.

Main cast
 Rex Bell as Jim Carden, posing as Jim Lloyd  
 Joan Barclay as Helen Haldain  
 Al St. John as Walla Walla Wiggins  
 Steve Clark as Milt Haldain  
 Georgia O'Dell as Rose Gilbury  
 Dick Botiller as Bald Eagle  
 Frank McCarroll as Henchman Slade Sangree  
 Forrest Taylor as Steven Cutting

References

Bibliography

External links
 

1936 films
1936 Western (genre) films
1930s English-language films
American Western (genre) films
Films directed by Robert F. Hill
American black-and-white films
1930s American films